The Hechun–Maoming railway or Hemao railway, is a railroad in Guangdong Province, China, between Hechun Station on the Litang–Zhanjiang railway and the city of Maoming. The line was originally built to support the development of the petrochemical industry in Maoming. After the completion of the Sanshui–Maoming railway in 1991, the Hemao Line became a connecting section between the Litang–Zhanjiang and Guangzhou–Maoming railways. Together, the three railways form part of China's southern coastal railway corridor.

Rail connections
 Hechun Station: Litang–Zhanjiang railway
 Maoming: Guangzhou–Maoming railway, Luoyang–Zhanjiang railway

See also

 List of railways in China

References

Railway lines in China
Rail transport in Guangdong